The Bamboozle 2007: Everything Will Be Much Better Once I Get These Clowns Out of My Head is the compilation album for The Bamboozle 2007 music festival and concert. It is also the first album released by Riot Squad Records

Track listing

Disc 1
"Age" – Pistolita (4:36)
"Liar (It Takes One to Know One)" – Taking Back Sunday (live at the Long Beach Arena in Long Beach, California, United States in July 2006) (3:16)
"Accidents" – Drive By (2:52)
"Red Flag" – Billy Talent (live at the Orange Lounge in Toronto, Ontario, Canada) (3:34)
"Tell Them that She's Not Scared" – Envy on the Coast (4:43)
"Even the Sand Is Made of Seashells" – Thursday (4:11)
"Slow By Still" – Damiera (3:40)
"Words" – Between the Trees (3:45)
"Bruised" – Phil Bensen (3:22)
"Newport Living" – Cute Is What We Aim For (3:28)
"Until You Leave" – Permanent Me (3:20)
"Tragedy" – Young Love (2:57)
"We Are Electric" – The Look (3:33)
"A Wolf in Sheep's Clothing" – This Providence (3:11)
"We Write Our Own Anthems" – The A.K.A.s (3:25)
"Monster" – Meg & Dia (2:40)
"Three Oh Nine" – Hit the Lights (2:59)
"I Woke Up Today" – Owen (2:23)
"Juggling Knives" – Status Green (3:41)

Disc 2
"House of Wolves" – My Chemical Romance (live from Fuse TV's "7th Avenue Drop") (3:11)
"Dry the River" – Maylene and the Sons of Disaster (3:41)
"Murder Was te Case That They Gave Me" – Leathermouth (2:42)
"The Arms of Sorrow" – Killswitch Engage (3:46)
"Set Fire to the Face on Fire" – The Blood Brothers (2:20)
"Html Rulez D00d" – The Devil Wears Prada (3:44)
"Break Out! Break Out!" – All Time Low (3:06)
"Confined" – As I Lay Dying (3:11)
"Guttershark" – The Bled (3:29)
"Fall Back Into My Life" – Amber Pacific (3:30)
"One Last Kiss" – Madina Lake (3:26)
"Suffocating" – Sound the Alarm (3:11)
"Cheer Up Emo Kid" – Patent Pending (2:50)
"Your Taste Is My Attention" – Lydia (4:41)
"Waitress" – State Radio (3:51)
"Dude, Where's My Skin?" – Schoolyard Heroes (2:37)
"Yes, Even Stars Break" – The Scene Aesthetic (4:04)

External links
Official MySpace page
Album page at Rriot Squad Records Website

2007 compilation albums
Music festival compilation albums